Transcode is a direct digital-to-digital data conversion process.

Transcode may also refer to:

 Transcode (character encoding), an IBM 6-bit data transmission code
 Base station subsystem#Transcoder